The GU postcode area, also known as the Guildford postcode area, is a group of 38 postcode districts in South East England, within 24 post towns. These cover west Surrey (including Guildford, Woking, Godalming, Cranleigh, Farnham, Camberley, Lightwater, Bagshot, Windlesham, Virginia Water, Hindhead and Haslemere), north-east Hampshire (including Aldershot, Farnborough, Fleet, Yateley, Petersfield, Alton, Bordon, Liphook and Liss), northwestern West Sussex (including Petworth and Midhurst) and a small part of south-east Berkshire (including Sandhurst).

Mail for this area is sorted at the Jubilee Mail Centre in Hounslow.
 


Coverage
The approximate coverage of the postcode districts:

|-
! GU1
| GUILDFORD
| Guildford Town Centre, Slyfield, Merrow, Burpham
| Guildford
|-
! GU2
| GUILDFORD
| Guildford Park, Onslow Village, Park Barn, University of Surrey
| Guildford
|-
! GU3
| GUILDFORD
| Normandy, Puttenham, Worplesdon, Christmas Pie, Flexford
| Guildford
|-
! GU4
| GUILDFORD
| Burpham, Chilworth, Jacobs Well, Shalford
| Guildford
|-
! GU5
| GUILDFORD
| Albury, Bramley, Shere
| Guildford, Waverley
|-
! GU6
| CRANLEIGH
| Cranleigh, Ewhurst, Alfold
| Waverley
|-
! GU7
| GODALMING
| Farncombe, Godalming
| Waverley
|-
! GU8
| GODALMING
| Chiddingfold, Dunsfold, Elstead, Hascombe, Milford, Thursley, Witley
| Waverley
|-
! GU9
| FARNHAM
| Farnham, Badshot Lea, Hale, Heath End
| Waverley
|-
! GU10
| FARNHAM
| Bentley, Frensham, Churt, Crondall, Tongham, Ewshot, Seale, Tilford, Wrecclesham
| Waverley, East Hampshire, Guildford, Hart
|-
! GU11
| ALDERSHOT
| Aldershot
| Rushmoor
|-
! GU12
| ALDERSHOT
| Aldershot, Ash, Ash Green, Ash Vale
| Rushmoor, Guildford
|-
! GU14
| FARNBOROUGH
| Farnborough, Cove, North Camp, Southwood
| Rushmoor
|-
! GU15
| CAMBERLEY
| Camberley, Old Dean, RMAS
| Surrey Heath, Bracknell Forest
|-
! GU16
| CAMBERLEY
| Frimley, Frimley Green, Deepcut, Mytchett
| Surrey Heath
|-
! GU17
| CAMBERLEY
| Blackwater, Hawley, Minley, Darby Green, Frogmore, Blackbushe
| Hart
|-
! GU18
| LIGHTWATER
| Lightwater
| Surrey Heath
|-
! GU19
| BAGSHOT
| Bagshot
| Surrey Heath
|-
! GU20
| WINDLESHAM
| Windlesham
| Surrey Heath
|-
! GU21
| WOKING
| Woking (north), Knaphill, St. John's, Horsell, Goldsworth Park
| Woking
|-
! GU22
| WOKING
| Woking (south), Pyrford, Hook Heath, Mayford, Old Woking
| Woking
|-
! GU23
| WOKING
| Send, Ripley, Ockham, Wisley
| Guildford
|-
! GU24
| WOKING
| Bisley, Pirbright, Chobham, Knaphill, Brookwood, West End
| Woking, Surrey Heath, Guildford
|-
! GU25
| VIRGINIA WATER
| Virginia Water, Wentworth
| Runnymede
|-
! GU26
| HINDHEAD
| Hindhead, Bramshott Chase, Grayshott
| Waverley, East Hampshire
|-
! style="background:#FFFFFF;"|GU27
| style="background:#FFFFFF;"|HINDHEAD
| style="background:#FFFFFF;"|
| style="background:#FFFFFF;"|non-geographic
|-
! GU27
| HASLEMERE
| Haslemere, Fernhurst, Shottermill, Grayswood
| Waverley, Chichester
|-
! GU28
| PETWORTH
| Petworth, Graffham, Northchapel, Byworth, Lodsworth
| Chichester
|-
! GU29
| MIDHURST
| Midhurst, Cocking, Easebourne
| Chichester
|-
! GU30
| LIPHOOK
| Liphook, Bramshott, Conford, Linch, Milland, Passfield
| East Hampshire, Chichester
|-
! GU31
| PETERSFIELD
| Petersfield (east), Buriton, East Harting, South Harting,  Elsted, Rogate
| East Hampshire, Chichester
|-
! GU32
| PETERSFIELD
| Petersfield (west and town centre), East Meon, West Meon, Sheet, Steep
| East Hampshire, Winchester
|-
! GU33
| LISS
| Liss, Greatham, Selborne, Rake
| East Hampshire, Chichester
|-
! GU34
| ALTON
| Alton, Beech, Bentworth, Medstead, Four Marks, Golden Pot, Lasham
| East Hampshire
|-
! GU35
| BORDON
| Bordon, Headley, Headley Down, Lindford, Oakhanger, Kingsley, Arford, Whitehill
| East Hampshire
|-
! GU46
| YATELEY
| Yateley
| Hart
|-
! GU47
| SANDHURST
| Sandhurst, College Town,  Owlsmoor, Little Sandhurst
| Bracknell Forest
|-
! GU51
| FLEET
| Fleet, Elvetham Heath
| Hart
|-
! GU52
| FLEET
| Church Crookham, Crookham Village
| Hart
|-
! style="background:#FFFFFF;"|GU95
| style="background:#FFFFFF;"|CAMBERLEY
| style="background:#FFFFFF;"|British Gas
| style="background:#FFFFFF;"|non-geographic
|}

The original GU13 district for Fleet was recoded to GU51 and GU52 in 2001.

Map

See also
Postcode Address File
List of postcode areas in the United Kingdom

References

External links
Royal Mail's Postcode Address File
A quick introduction to Royal Mail's Postcode Address File (PAF) 
Map of GU Postal Area

Guildford
Woking
Postcode areas covering South East England